Joe Reed may refer to:

People 

Joe L. Reed (born 1938), American politician
Joe Reed (quarterback) (born 1948), American football quarterback
Joe Reed (wide receiver) (born 1998), American football wide receiver

Horses 

Joe Reed (horse) (1921–1947), a Quarter Horse racehorse
Joe Reed II (1936–1964), son of the above

See also
Joseph Reed (disambiguation)
Joel M. Reed, film producer